Jacoby may refer to:

Jacoby (given name)
Jacoby (surname)
Jacoby Glacier, a glacier in Antarctica
Jacoby transfer, a convention used in the card game contract bridge

See also 
 Jacobi (disambiguation)